The 2012–13 Euroleague was the 13th season of the modern era of Euroleague Basketball and the third under the title sponsorship of the Turkish Airlines. Including the competition's previous incarnation as the FIBA Europe Champions Cup, this was the 56th season of the premier competition for European men's clubs. The season started on 11 October 2012 and finished on 12 May 2013.

The Final Four was held at The O2 Arena in London. The championship game was won by Olympiacos, who defeated Real Madrid 100–88. Olympiacos became the third team since the introduction of the Final Four format to win two Euroleague championships in a row and the second team in Euroleague Basketball Company era (Euroleague 2000–01 season to present) to become back-to-back Euroleague champions.

Allocation
A total of 31 teams participated in the 2012–13 Euroleague. There were three routes to participation in the Euroleague:
 The top 13 teams with an A-Licence from the 2011–12 Euroleague based on their Euroleague Club Ranking.
 An additional team promoted to an A-Licence.
 The 2011–12 Eurocup winner was given a C-Licence.
 14 places were allocated from a list of 28 teams given a B-Licence ranked according to their European national basketball league rankings over the last year. 14 teams were given both an A-Licence or C-Licence and a B-Licence. When a country ranking spot had already been assigned to an A-Licence team, the assignation jumped to the next country appearing in the ranking, and their league was not granted an additional place in the competition. The first 8 of the remaining 16 teams were given places in the regular-season, and the next 6 were given places in the qualifying competition. The last 2 places from the Netherlands and Latvia were not taken up.
 As the list of teams with a B-Licence was exhausted, two wild cards were granted to fill the remaining spaces in the qualifying competition.

Euroleague allocation criteria
On 31 May 2012, the Euroleague published the official License Allocation criteria.

A licenses

 The A license of Acea Roma was cancelled and it was awarded to Italian team EA7 Milano.

B licenses

* The Adriatic League teams (1 from Serbia, 1 from Slovenia and 1 from Croatia) were the ones with the best Adriatic League + National League + European competitions ranking.
** Next best team from the Adriatic League without B licence.

C licenses and wildcards
C license converted in wildcard for the Regular Season (since 2011–12 Eurocup champion BC Khimki qualified via B license):
 Alba Berlin
Wildcards for the Qualification Rounds:
 Mapooro Cantù
 UNICS

Teams
On 31 May 2012 the new Euroleague license allocation criteria were announced. Twenty-three teams directly joined the regular season, while one more team joined it from the qualifying rounds. Eight teams fought for the last berth, and Mapooro Cantù got the final spot.

The labels in the parentheses show how each team qualified for the place of its starting round (TH: Euroleague title holders):
A: Qualified through an A–licence
1st, 2nd, etc.: League position after Playoffs
QR: Qualifying rounds
WC: Wild card
EC: Champion of the 2011–12 Eurocup Basketball

Qualifying rounds

The qualifying rounds were played in a knock-out tournament consisting of eight teams in a single-venue tournament format. The winner advanced to the Euroleague Regular Season. The qualifying rounds were played between 25 and 28 September at the PalaDesio in Desio, Italy.

Draw
The draws for the 2012–13 Turkish Airlines Euroleague were held on Friday, 6 July. The draws determined the qualifying-round matchups and regular-season groups for the Euroleague, as well as the qualifying rounds for the Eurocup and the regular-season for the EuroChallenge.

Teams were seeded into six pots of four teams in accordance with the Club Ranking, based on their performance in European competitions during a three-year period.

Two teams from the same country could not be drawn together in the same Regular Season group.

Regular season
The regular season began on 11 October 2012.

If teams were level on record at the end of the Regular Season, tiebreakers were applied in the following order:
 Head-to-head record.
 Head-to-head point differential.
 Point differential during the Regular Season.
 Points scored during the regular season.
 Sum of quotients of points scored and points allowed in each Regular Season match.

Group A

Group B

Group C

Group D

Top 16
The Top 16 began on 27 December 2012.

If teams were level on record at the end of the Top 16, tiebreakers were applied in the following order:
 Head-to-head record.
 Head-to-head point differential.
 Point differential during the Top 16.
 Points scored during the Top 16.
 Sum of quotients of points scored and points allowed in each Top 16 match.

Group E

Group F

Quarterfinals

Final Four

On 12 May 2012 it was announced the Final Four would be hosted at The O2 Arena in London, United Kingdom.

Top 10 attendances

Single game

Average

Individual statistics

Rating

Points

Rebounds

Assists

Other Stats

Game highs

Awards

Euroleague 2012–13 MVP 
  Vassilis Spanoulis (  Olympiacos)

Euroleague 2012–13 Final Four MVP 
  Vassilis Spanoulis (  Olympiacos)

All-Euroleague Team 2012–13

Top Scorer (Alphonso Ford Trophy)
  Bobby Brown (  Montepaschi Siena)

Best Defender
  Stéphane Lasme (  Panathinaikos)

Rising Star
  Kostas Papanikolaou (  Olympiacos)

Coach of the Year (Alexander Gomelsky Award)
  Georgios Bartzokas (  Olympiacos)

MVP Weekly

Regular season

Top 16

Quarter-finals

MVP of the Month

See also
 2012–13 Eurocup Basketball
 2012–13 FIBA EuroChallenge

References

External links

 Official website

 
EuroLeague seasons